José Poll (24 September 1950 – April 2020) was a Cuban wrestler. He competed in the men's Greco-Roman 90 kg at the 1980 Summer Olympics.

References

External links
 

1950 births
2020 deaths
Cuban male sport wrestlers
Olympic wrestlers of Cuba
Wrestlers at the 1980 Summer Olympics
Place of birth missing
Pan American Games medalists in wrestling
Pan American Games gold medalists for Cuba
Pan American Games silver medalists for Cuba
Pan American Games bronze medalists for Cuba
Wrestlers at the 1979 Pan American Games
Wrestlers at the 1983 Pan American Games
Medalists at the 1979 Pan American Games
20th-century Cuban people
21st-century Cuban people